Diplopseustis nigerialis is a moth in the family Crambidae. It was described by George Hampson in 1906 and is found in Nigeria.

References

Spilomelinae
Endemic fauna of Nigeria
Moths described in 1906
Moths of Africa
Taxa named by George Hampson